Veeran Veluthambi is a 1987 Tamil-language action film directed by Rama Narayanan, starring Vijayakanth and Radha Ravi .

Cast
Vijayakanth as Inspector Rahman (Guest Appearance)
Radha Ravi as Veeran Veluthambi
Karthik as Thirumalai (Guest Appearance)
Ambika
Rekha as Meghala
A. V. M. Rajan as IG of Police
Chandrasekhar
Jai Ganesh
S. S. Chandran
Thyagu
Pasi Sathya
Senthil

Soundtrack

The music was composed by S. A. Rajkumar.

References

External links

1987 films
1980s Tamil-language films
Films directed by Rama Narayanan
Films scored by S. A. Rajkumar
Films with screenplays by M. Karunanidhi